The Raleigh Police Department is the municipal law enforcement agency of Raleigh, North Carolina.

Overview
The Raleigh Police Department is a full service police department, serving all areas in the city limits of Raleigh, and some properties which are owned by the City and situated outside the city limits (such as Lake Wheeler Park).  Though RPD has jurisdiction at all locations inside the city limits and all properties owned by the City, other agencies sometimes take on first responder responsibilities at certain locations.  For example, NC State University Campus Police respond initially to any emergency police calls on the campus of North Carolina State University, even though the main campus is located in the Raleigh city limits.  Some law enforcement support tasks are outsourced to other agencies in the county.  Crime scene processing is handled by City/County Bureau of Identification, and the county jail is operated by the Wake County Sheriff's Office.

Organization
The Raleigh Police Department is organized into five divisions:
 The Chief's Office contains Internal Affairs, Inspections, the Police Attorney, and support staff.
 Field Operations is the backbone of the department, as most of the officers responding to 911 calls report to the Field Operations Division.  The Division is commanded by a Major.
 Special Operations houses many specialty units, such as K-9, Animal Control, Selective Enforcement Unit, and Gang Suppression Unit, among others.
 Investigative Division is responsible for investigating most of the crimes that require follow up after the initial officer response.
 Administrative Division contains personnel that support the rest of the department, such as Records, Quartermaster, Information Technology, and the Police Service Center, who maintains the fleet of police vehicles.

District Information

Rank structure

Officers that become Officer First Class, Master Officer, and Senior Officer wear patches on each arm similar to Sergeants.

Vehicles
All marked Raleigh Police Department vehicles are a distinct blue and white, though unmarked vehicles are also used. The standard patrol vehicle is the Ford Crown Victoria Police Interceptor, while many officers within Special Operations units utilize the Chevrolet Tahoes, upfitted for police work. The Departments Motor Unit utilizes BMW R1200RT-P motorcycles for traffic enforcement. Several other vehicles, including bicycles, ATV's, Segways, horses, and others are also fielded by the department.  The Raleigh Police Department does not currently have aviation or marine units. Most marked vehicles are outfitted with some or all of the latest in police technology such as Mobile Computer Terminals (MCTs) with internet connectivity, LoJack receivers, Digital Video Recording, 800 MHz radios, GPS, and other technologies.

Equipment
The Patrol Officers standard duty belt includes:
 Smith & Wesson or Peerless handcuffs, either chain or hinged
 Sabre Red Oleoresin Capsicum (OC Spray) 2,000,000 SHU "Pepper" Spray
 Asp Friction-Loc 21" steel expandable baton
 Streamlight Strion rechargeable LED Flashlight
 Motorola APX Series Radio
 Smith & Wesson M&P pistol, .45ACP
 Taser X2 Electronic Control Device (Issued to selected Officers once they complete the required training/exposure)
 Patrol Officers may also carry a long gun which can be either a Smith & Wesson M&P15, AR-15 Platform, chambered in .223/5.56, equipped with a Surefire M500A Weaponlight, or a Remington 870 Police Magnum 12-Gauge shotgun also equipped with a Surefire light.
 
Raleigh also has three full-time Selective Enforcement Unit (SEU) Teams, which is Raleigh's equivalent of a SWAT Team.  Officers assigned to SEU carry a wide variety of specialized equipment and weaponry including the M4 Carbine, Heckler and Koch MP5, and UMP-45. Additional specialized units within the department often field other items and pieces of equipment specific to the task which they are designated to perform.

See also

 List of law enforcement agencies in North Carolina

References

External links
Raleigh Police Department website

Police
Municipal police departments of North Carolina